The 86th Fighter Wing (86 FW) is a disbanded unit of the United States Air Force, last stationed at Buckley Field, Denver, Colorado. It was withdrawn from the Colorado Air National Guard (CO ANG) and inactivated on 31 October 1950.

This wing is not related to the United States Air Force 86th Fighter Wing that was Constituted on 1 July 1948 and activated in Germany the same day by the United States Air Forces in Europe.

History

World War II
Activated as an intermediate echelon organization for Fifth Air Force in late 1943.

From May 1944 to August 1945, it operating as a command and control echelon with various groups that were attached for brief periods in the Southwest Pacific Area.  After the end of hostilities, the wing became responsible for establishing and operating an aircraft warning system in the Philippine Islands.

All personnel and equipment transferred to the 64th Fighter Wing on 15 February 1946 and the unit became an administrative unit.  Inactivated on 15 March 1946.

Air National Guard
Allocated to the Colorado Air National Guard for command and control origination for units in the Rocky Mountain region (Idaho, Montana, Wyoming, Colorado, New Mexico) of the United States.  Extended federal recognition and activated on 3 July 1946.

At the end of October 1950, the Air National Guard converted to the wing-base (Hobson Plan) organization. As a result, the wing was withdrawn from the Colorado ANG and was inactivated on 31 October 1950.  The 140th Fighter Wing was established by the National Guard Bureau, allocated to the state of Colorado, recognized and activated 1 November 1950; assuming the personnel, equipment and mission of the inactivated 86th Fighter Wing.

Lineage
 Constituted as 86th Fighter Wing on 19 November 1943
 Activated on 1 December 1943
 Inactivated on 15 March 1946.
 Allotted to the Colorado ANG on 24 May 1946
 Extended federal recognition and activated on 3 July 1946
 Inactivated, and returned to the control of the Department of the Air Force, on 31 October 1950
 Disbanded on 15 June 1983

Assignments
 Fourth Air Force, 1 December 1943
 Fifth Air Force, 1 May 1944 – 15 March 1946
 Attached to: 308th Bombardment Wing, 16 January – 15 March 1946.
 Colorado Air National Guard, 3 July 1946 – 31 October 1950

Components

World War II
 8th Fighter Group: 1 May 1944 – 16 August 1945
 49th Fighter Group: 1 May 1944 – 9 January 1945
 58th Fighter Group: 1 May – 25 August 1944

Colorado Air National Guard
 140th Fighter Group, 3 July 1946 – 31 October 1950
 186th Fighter Squadron, 27 June 1947 – 31 October 1950 (Montana ANG)
 187th Fighter Squadron, 11 August 1946 – 31 October 1950 (Wyoming ANG)
 188th Fighter Squadron, 7 July 1947 – 31 October 1950 (New Mexico ANG)
 190th Fighter Squadron, 13 October 1946 – 31 October 1950 (Idaho ANG)

Stations
 March Field, California, 1 December 1943 – 25 March 1944
 Finschhafen Airport, New Guinea, 1 May 1944
 Middleburg Airfield, New Guinea, 4 August 1944
 Sansapor Airfield, New Guinea, 19 August 1944
 San Marcelino Airfield, Luzon, Philippines, 16 January 1945 – 15 March 1946.
 Buckley Field, Denver, Colorado, 3 July 1946 – 31 October 1950

References

 Maurer, Maurer (1983). Air Force Combat Units of World War II. Maxwell AFB, Alabama: Office of Air Force History. .

Military units and formations established in 1943
086
Military units and formations disestablished in 1983
086